Ekmek kadayıfı is a bread pudding that was historically part of Ottoman cuisine and in modern times remains part of the cuisines of the former Ottoman Empire.  It is usually served with kaymak, a kind of clotted cream.  In Turkey it is considered a regional specialty of Afyonkarahisar.

History
Historically, as with other bread puddings, this recipe emerged as a way to utilize stale or day-old bread. For modern home cooks, it is a popular alternative to more demanding traditional desserts like baklava. It is served at iftar meals during Ramadan.

Preparation
In modern times, ekmek kadayifi is sold ready made. All the cook needs to do at home to prepare the dessert is to make the sugar syrup called şerbet and top the finished dessert with kaymak cream or ice cream.

To prepare the dessert from scratch with bread, first a piece of bread is carefully hollowed out to make a bread bowl. If the bread is too fresh it may be further dried in an oven. A dark caramel şerbet is poured over the prepared bread. It is important to prepare the bread correctly to maximize absorption of the şerbet. When the bread has fully absorbed the şerbet it softens. The bread bowl can then be filled with ice cream before serving. The finished dessert is flipped upside down to make ice cream stuffed ekmek kadayif.

Some recipes prepare it as a simple cake made with eggs, flour and sugar. First the eggs and sugar are whisked until the eggs are frothy, then the flour is mixed in. A little baking powder is added as a leavening agent. The cream filling for the cake is made with milk, cornstarch, flour, sugar and powdered Crème Chantilly. When fully baked, the thin cake is cut in half like a layer cake. Şerbet syrup is poured over the bottom layer and a layer of cream is spread between the two cake layers. The top layer is cut into slices and arranged on top of the cream. The remaining şerbet syrup is poured over the assembled cake, which is garnished with ground pistachio and shredded coconut. The cake is left to set in the fridge for several hours before it is ready to be served.

See also
List of Turkish desserts

These dishes are based on the same core ingredients, and have (confusingly) similar names, but are different:
 Qatayef
 Kataifi and other kinds of kanafeh

References

 
 

Ottoman cuisine
Turkish puddings